The 2020 African Wrestling Championships was held in Algiers, Algeria from 8 to 9 February 2020.

Competitions were held in three age groups: cadets, juniors, and seniors according to United World Wrestling rules.

Medals

Seniors

Juniors (U20)

Cadets (U17)

Medal summary

Men's freestyle

Men's Greco-Roman

Women's freestyle

References 

African Wrestling Championships
Africa
International sports competitions hosted by Algeria
African Wrestling Championships
African Wrestling Championships
Sports competitions in Algiers